Camp of Great Poland (OWP) was a far-right, nationalist political organization of National Democracy in interwar Poland.

History
Camp of Great Poland was founded on 4 December 1926 in Poznań by Popular National Union (Związek Ludowo-Narodowy, ZLN) and other organizations of right-wing National Democracy political camp, led by Roman Dmowski, to unite Polish right-wing organizations and oppose sanacja regime, which gained power following Józef Piłsudski's May Coup in 1926. After merging with National Pupulist Union in 1928 OWP retained its autonomy within newly established National Party.

In 1927 youth branch of the organization was established., which virtually dominated OWP by 1928. OWP positions in Polish universities among students were especially strong, it also gained popularity among workers and the lower middle class. In January 1930 Camp of Great Poland had 35,000 members, in May 1932 its membership reached 120,000. By 1933 OWP claimed to have a quarter of a million followers.

Outbreaks of the anti-Jewish violence in Eastern Galicia in 1927 led the organization to be banned in that region that year. After a further wave of nationwide violence in 1933 OWP eventually banned in entire Poland. Government, alarmed by rapid growth of OWP, banned the organization together with its youth movement on 28 March 1933. on the grounds that these organizations threatened stability of the state. After dissolution of the organization, even more radical young members of OWP formed the National Radical Camp. ONR would be banned soon after its establishment, in 1934.

Organization
Camp of Great Poland was led by the Great Council. The head of the council, with the title of the Great Camp-maker was Roman Dmowski; other notable members included Tadeusz Bielecki, Marian Borzęcki, Stanisław Haller and Roman Rybarski.

Views
Camp of Great Poland supported strongly religious corporative authoritarianism, borrowing some ideas from Italian Fascism.

OWP did not pursue its goals on the political scene, increasingly controlled by Piłsudskiite Sanacja; instead it aimed to create a violent, revolutionary movement aimed at toppling the government. Camp of Great Poland even had its own fighting squads organized.

OWP front organization, the Green Ribbon League actively propagated a boycott of the Jewish-owned businesses. In early 1930s OWP campaigned for numerus nullus, a policy of complete exclusion of Jewish students and academics from Polish universities. OWP anti-Jewish activities weren't however limited to political means only. OWP openly incited anti-Jewish riots, and its youth movement advocated violence against Jewish students. OWP and related youth organizations were engaged in violent attacks against Jews. Those attacks eventually led the Polish government to ban the organization.

Today's Poland 

Organization was many times re-established, the first time as political party in Lublin (1993) by prof. Jan Trochimiak. After founded in 2003 as an ordinary association in Wroclaw. Finally, in 2012 the OWP was registered in the National Registrar of Companies and Legal Entities (Krajowy Rejestr Sądowy; KRS) in Warsaw, gaining legal personality. Honorary chairman of the OWP is Jan Kobylański.

See also
 Camp of Great Poland (association)

Footnotes

References

1926 establishments in Poland
1933 disestablishments in Poland
Catholic political parties
Corporatism
Defunct political parties in Poland
Far-right political parties in Poland
National Democracy
Nationalist parties in Poland
Polish nationalist parties
Political history of Poland
Political parties disestablished in 1933
Political parties established in 1926